A revolution is a drastic political change that usually occurs relatively quickly. For revolutions which affect society, culture, and technology more than political systems, see social revolution.

Revolution may also refer to:

Aviation
Warner Revolution I, an American homebuilt aircraft design
Warner Revolution II, an American homebuilt aircraft design

Books
Revolution (book), by Russell Brand, 2014
Revolution (novel), by Jennifer Donnelly, 2010
Revolution, the first part of the 2013 novelization of the first book of the animated TV series The Legend of Korra
The Revolution: A Manifesto, by Ron Paul, 2008
Revolution: A Sociological Interpretation, by Michael Kimmel, 1990

Comics
Revolution (Marvel Comics), 2000
Revolution (IDW Publishing), 2016

Computing
Revolution (software platform), a development environment based on the MetaCard engine
Revolution Analytics, a statistical software company
Revolution, the former name of LiveCode, a software platform and cross-platform software development environment featuring a dynamically-typed programming language known as Transcript
Runtime Revolution (RunRev), the former name of LiveCode, Ltd., the software company that develops the LiveCode software platform
Revolution, prototype name for the Wii video game console produced by Nintendo
Revolution Software, an English videogame company
Revolution (video game), 1986 computer game released by U.S. Gold

Engineering and science
In astronomy and related fields, the term "revolution" is used when one body moves around (orbits) another while the term "rotation" is used to mean the movement around an axis
Industrial Revolution, an 18th–19th-century period of rapid technological development in the West
Second Industrial Revolution, also known as the Technological Revolution
Revolution engine, a Harley–Davidson engine
Revolutions per minute (RPM), a unit of frequency measuring rotational speed, as around a fixed axis

Film
Revolution, a 1967 eight-minute short by Peter Greenaway
Revolution (1968 film), a documentary film by Jack O'Connell made in San Francisco
Révolution, a 1985 French adult film directed by José Bénazéraf
Revolution (1985 film), a film about a New York fur trapper during the American Revolutionary War
Revolution!! (1989), a comic re-enactment of the French Revolution by the National Theatre of Brent
Revolution (2012 film), a documentary movie about taking a stand against environmental degradation
RevoLOUtion: The Transformation of Lou Benedetti a 2006 dramedy about a Brooklyn boxer
Revolution OS (2001), a 2001 documentary on Linux and the free software movement
Revolution Studios, a film production company

Television
"Revolution" (Law & Order: Criminal Intent), the Law & Order: Criminal Intent eighth-season finale based on a banking revolution
The Revolution (miniseries), a 2006 American documentary miniseries about the American Revolution that was broadcast on History Channel
The Revolution (TV program), a 2012 American health and lifestyle talk television program that aired on ABC
Revolution (TV series), an American science fiction series that ran from 2012 to 2014
Revolucija (TV series), a Serbian television series that ran from 2013 to 2015
 Supermodel Me: Revolution, the sixth season of Supermodel Me

Mathematics
Surface of revolution
Revolution (geometry), a complete rotation
Orbital revolution, the cyclical path taken by one object around another object, as of planets

Medicine
Selamectin, a parasiticide and anthelminthic for cats and dogs, with the trade name Revolution

Music

Albums
Revolution (All Star United album), and the title song
Revolution (Paula Cole album)
Revolution (Crematory album), and the title song
Revolution (The Dubliners album)
Revolution (Hypnogaja album)
Revolution (Kara album)
Revolution (Lacrimosa album), and the title song
Revolution (Little Steven album), and the title song
Revolution (Miranda Lambert album)
Revolution (Sirsy album)
Revolution (Sister Machine Gun album)
Revolution (Slaughter album)
Revolution (Tiësto album)
Revolution (YFriday album), and the title song
Revolution!, by Paul Revere & The Raiders
Revolution (Anew Revolution EP)
Revolution, by 2R
Revolution, by Dilba
Revolution, by Diplo, and the title song
Revolution, by Wickeda
Revolution, an EP by One Minute Silence
The Revolution (Belly album)
The Revolution (Inhabited album)
The Revolution (EP), by Van William, and the title song featuring First Aid Kit
(R)evolution, by Minimum Serious
(r)Evolution, by HammerFall
REvolution, by Lynch Mob
The Revolution, by Fiach Moriarty and Wallis Bird

Songs
"Revolution" (Beatles song), 1968
"Revolution" (Chumbawamba song), 1985
"Revolution" (Coldrain song), 2018
"Revolution" (The Cult song), 1985
"Revolution" (Jars of Clay song), 2002
"Revolution" (Judas Priest song), 2005
"Revolution" (Nina Simone song), 1968
"Revolution" (R3hab and Nervo and Ummet Ozcan song), 2013
"Revolution" (Stefanie Heinzmann song), 2008
"Revolution" (Tomorrow song), 1967
"Revolution" (The Veronicas song), 2006
"Revolution", by 30 Seconds to Mars, an unreleased song
"Revolution", by Accept from Stalingrad
"Revolution", by Aimee Allen, used as the title music for the TV series Birds of Prey
"Revolution", by Arrested Development
"Revolution", by Audio Adrenaline from Audio Adrenaline
"Revolution", by Bang Camaro from Bang Camaro II
"Revolution", by Bob Marley from Natty Dread
"Revolution", by Built to Spill from Ultimate Alternative Wavers
"Revolution", by Dennis Brown
"Revolution", by Doug Wimbish from CinemaSonics
"Revolution", by Eric Clapton from Back Home
"Revolution", by Flogging Molly from Speed of Darkness
"Revolution", by Kirk Franklin from The Nu Nation Project
"Revolution", by Krayzie Bone, featuring The Marley Brothers, from Thug Mentality 1999
"Revolution", by Lil' Kim from The Notorious K.I.M.
"Revolution", by Livin Out Loud from Then and Now
"Revolution", by Moth from Immune to Gravity
"Revolution", by P.O.D. from Payable on Death
"Revolution", by Public Enemy from New Whirl Odor
"Revolution", by R.E.M. from the soundtrack Batman & Robin and their documentary video Road Movie
"Revolution", by Robbie Williams from Escapology
"Revolution", by Rogue Traders from We Know What You're Up To
"Revolution", by Spacemen 3 from Playing with Fire
"Revolution", by Steve Angello from Wild Youth
"Revolution", by Theatre of Tragedy from Forever Is the World
"Revolution (B-Boy Anthem)", by Zion I
"Revolution (In the Summertime?)", by Cosmic Rough Riders
"Revolution 9", by The Beatles
"Revolution 909", by Daft Punk
"Revolution 1993", by Jamiroquai from Emergency on Planet Earth
"Revolution Song", by Oasis, a demo recorded during the sessions for Standing on the Shoulder of Giants
"The Revolution" (Exile Tribe song)
"The Revolution", by Attack Attack! from This Means War
"The Revolution", by BT from the soundtrack Lara Croft: Tomb Raider
"The Revolution", by Chris de Burgh from The Getaway
"The Revolution", by Coolio from Gangsta's Paradise
"The Revolution", by David Byrne from Look into the Eyeball
"The Revolution", by Scooter from Back to the Heavyweight Jam
"The Revolution", by Tom Verlaine from The Miller's Tale: A Tom Verlaine Anthology
"La révolution", by Tryo from Mamagubida
"(r)Evolution", by HammerFall from (r)Evolution

Other
Revolution (duo), a South African house band
The Revolution (band), Prince's original band, formed in 1979
Revolution Records, a U.S. record label
Ram Revolution, a Ram Truck Division fully-electric pickup truck.

Politics
Revolution (political group), a political group founded by the League for a Fifth International
Total revolution, the political philosophy of veganism and anarchism

Publications
Revolution (weekly), organ of the Revolutionary Communist Party, USA
The Revolution (newspaper), a women's rights newspaper published from 1868 to 1872

Society
Revolution (Pleasure Beach Blackpool), a roller coaster at Blackpool Pleasure Beach, England
Vekoma Illusion, a roller coaster model named Revolution at Bobbejaanland in Belgium
Revolution (vodka bar), a brand of bars founded in Manchester in 1996
Revolution LLC, a principal investment firm founded by former AOL chairman Steve Case
Revolution (pet medicine), a flea and heartworm preventative treatment for cats and dogs
The Revolution (radio station), a former radio station broadcasting to Oldham, Rochdale and Tameside, United Kingdom

Sport
AEW Revolution, an annual professional wrestling event by All Elite Wrestling (AEW)
New England Revolution, a Major League Soccer team
Revolution, a ball rotation in ten-pin bowling
Revolution, nickname of a United States men's national Australian rules football team
Shropshire Revolution, American football team in Shropshire, England
Revolution (cycling series), a track cycling event held at the Manchester Velodrome, England
Various professional wrestling tag teams and stables:
The Revolution (TNA) in Total Nonstop Action Wrestling
The Revolution (WCW), in World Championship Wrestling
Revolution (puroresu) in various puroresu promotions

Visual arts
Alternative title for The Crowd, a painting by Wyndham Lewis

See also
List of revolutions and rebellions
Our Revolution (disambiguation)
Revolución (disambiguation)
Revolutions (disambiguation)
R-Evolution (disambiguation)
Viva la revolución (disambiguation)